Dysgonia arcifera is a moth of the family Noctuidae first described by Herbert Druce in 1912. It is found in western Africa.

References

Dysgonia
Fauna of the Gambia
Moths of Africa